Mollisinopsis is a genus of fungi in the family Helotiaceae. The genus contains 3 species.

References

Helotiaceae